Florida Technical College is a for profit college with multiple campuses in Florida. Established in 1982, FTC offers associate's and bachelor's degrees as well as diploma programs on six campuses: Cutler Bay, DeLand, Orlando, Kissimmee, Pembroke Pines and Lakeland.

History 
Florida Technical College (FTC) is a private academic unit part of National University College. It was founded in 1982 to provide post-secondary degrees. The Orlando main campus opened in 1982, and offered an approach to education that had students take one class at a time.

In 1984, FTC opened a campus in Jacksonville. In 1987, the Tampa campus moved to a larger location east Tampa. FTC's Lakeland campus opened in 1990, and the DeLand campus in 1997. Classes began in Kissimmee in April 2011, the Pembroke Pines campus opened in November 2011, and the Cutler Bay campus opened for classes January 2015.

In 2016, a former administrative assistant filed a lawsuit under the False Claims Act against the school, alleging that the school had enrolled students who didn't have a high school diploma or GED to increase the school's enrollment numbers, resulting in additional federal financial aid funds. FTC  cooperated with the investigation and settled the case in February 2018, agreeing to pay $600,000 and stating that the admissions staff and managers involved in the situation were no longer employed at the school.

In February 2018, Florida Technical College became an academic unit of the National University College. As an academic unit, FTC became accredited by the Middle States Commission on Higher Education.

In June 2020, Orlando Magic named FTC the official technical college of the team. In October, the Miami Dolphins named the college the official culinary school of the team. Both teams partner with the school to engage in community outreach.

In 2020, FTC was named The Florida Association of Postsecondary Schools and Colleges 2020 Institution of the Year.

In January 2021, FTC partnered with the African American Chamber of Commerce of Central Florida to create a business opportunity scholarship. Also in 2021, the Hispanic Chamber of Commerce Metro Orlando and FTC awarded the first Reach Higher Business Opportunity Scholarship.

See also 
 Accrediting Council for Independent Colleges and Schools

References

External links 
 

Colleges accredited by the Accrediting Council for Independent Colleges and Schools
Educational institutions established in 1982
Universities and colleges in Lakeland, Florida
Universities and colleges in Orlando, Florida
1982 establishments in Florida
Private universities and colleges in Florida